Troy Robert McCarthy (born 14 December 1966) is an Australian former professional rugby league footballer who played for Gold Coast in the NSWRL.

Biography
McCarthy, a Queensland junior representative, was a foundation player for the Gold Coast in the 1988 NSWRL season. Then known as Gold Coast-Tweed, the club was coached by his father, Australian former representative Bob McCarthy.

From 1988 to 1993, McCarthy made 45 first-grade appearances for the Gold Coast, mostly as a centre and full-back.

During his time with the Gold Coast he also had a stint in England playing for the Hull Kingston Rovers, in the 1991–92 Championship.

He has an elder brother, Darren McCarthy, who played for South Sydney and Canterbury.

His coaching career includes a Queensland Cup premiership with the Tweed Heads Seagulls to 2007.

References

External links
Troy McCarthy at Rugby League project

1966 births
Living people
Australian rugby league coaches
Australian rugby league players
Rugby league centres
Rugby league fullbacks
Rugby league players from Queensland
Gold Coast Chargers players
Tweed Heads Seagulls coaches
Hull Kingston Rovers players